Allan Findlay may refer to:
 Alan Findlay (1873–1943), Scottish trade unionist
 Allan Mackay Findlay, British geographer